The EURISOL project is aimed at the design – and eventual construction – of a 'next-generation' European ISOL radioactive ion beam (RIB) facility capable of extending current research in atomic and nuclear physics by providing users with a wide variety of exotic ion beams at intensities far greater than those presently available. The first phase of the project, completed in 2003, set out to determine the feasibility of the project. Phase 2, the EURISOL Design Study, is currently underway and is scheduled to last 4 years. Meant to identify the technological challenges facing the construction of the EURISOL facility, the Design Study has been divided into 12 sub tasks each focusing on a particular aspect of the facility's creation.

Task 9 – Beam Preparation

A central goal of the new EURISOL facility is to produce a variety of exotic ions at yields orders of magnitude above those currently available at RIB installations around the world. To fully utilize such high intensity beams and avoid overwhelming (and dangerous) isobaric contamination, accompanying efforts are needed in the new field of beam preparation and purification. In order to use high-resolution mass separation to eliminate isobaric impurities, a reduction of the beam emittance by an RFQ coolers is necessary to minimize transmission losses. As a result, a key feature in next generation RFQ beam coolers will be their ability to handle beam currents in the microampere range. Task 9's main objective will be to determine the ability of these next-generation devices to accumulate, cool, bunch and purify EURISOL's high intensity radioactive ion beams.

See also
On-Line Isotope Mass Separator
Radioactive Ion Beam Optimization

References

External links
Eurisol Project
Eurisol Design Study

Particle experiments